Road 71 connects Tehran to the Persian Gulf.

It traverses Isfahan Province, Hormozgan Province, Kermān Province, Qom Province, Tehran and Tehran Province, and Yazd Province.

References 

 Iran Road Maintenance & Transportation Organization
 Road management center of Iran
 Ministry of Roads & Urban Development of Iran

External links 

 Iran road map on Young Journalists Club

71
Transport in Isfahan
Transportation in Isfahan Province
Transportation in Hormozgan Province
Transportation in Kerman Province
Transport in Qom
Transportation in Qom Province
Transport in Tehran
Transportation in Tehran Province
Transportation in Yazd Province